Luciano Lionel Bocco Cutro (born 27 October 2000) is a Mexican footballer who plays as a defender for Central Córdoba (Santiago del Estero).

Early life
Bocco was born to Argentine parents in Mexico as his father, former footballer Pablo Bocco, was playing there at the time. He was raised in his father's hometown of Córdoba, Argentina.

Career
In 2020, Bocco signed for Mexican second-tier side Cancún. In 2022, he signed for Central Córdoba (Santiago del Estero) in the Argentine top flight.

References

External links
 

2000 births
Association football defenders
Cancún F.C. footballers
Central Córdoba de Santiago del Estero footballers
Footballers from Mexico City
Liga de Expansión MX players
Living people
Mexican footballers
Mexican people of Argentine descent
Sportspeople of Argentine descent
Citizens of Argentina through descent
Footballers from Córdoba, Argentina
Argentine footballers